Diego Antonio Figueredo Matiauda (born 28 April 1982 in Asunción) is a Paraguayan former football player who last played for Club Rubio Ñú in the Primera División Paraguaya.

Career
He started his career in Olimpia Asunción of Paraguay before moving to Real Valladolid of Spain. He has also played for Godoy Cruz in Argentina, Boavista FC of Portugal and Cerro Porteño of the Liga Paraguaya.

Figueredo was part of the silver medal-winning Paraguayan 2004 Olympic football team, losing to Argentina in the final, a match in which he was sent off.

References

External links
 
 

1982 births
Living people
Paraguayan footballers
Club Olimpia footballers
Boavista F.C. players
Real Valladolid players
La Liga players
Godoy Cruz Antonio Tomba footballers
Cerro Porteño players
Club Nacional footballers
Everton de Viña del Mar footballers
Independiente F.B.C. footballers
Club Guaraní players
Sportivo Luqueño players
Club Rubio Ñu footballers
Paraguayan Primera División players
2004 Copa América players
Paraguayan expatriate footballers
Expatriate footballers in Argentina
Expatriate footballers in Chile
Expatriate footballers in Spain
Olympic footballers of Paraguay
Footballers at the 2004 Summer Olympics
Olympic silver medalists for Paraguay
Olympic medalists in football
Paraguayan expatriate sportspeople in Portugal
Paraguayan expatriate sportspeople in Spain
Medalists at the 2004 Summer Olympics
Association football midfielders
Paraguay international footballers